Lenin Mithran Mithralayam Shanmugan (born 26 April 1995), known as Lenin Mithran, is an Indian professional football player who plays as a midfielder for I-League side Chennai City F.C.

Early life 
Mithran was born on 26 April 1995 in Kerala, India.

Career

Chennai City F.C. 
Mithran signed for Chennai City F.C on 2019. He played his debut match for the club on 25 January 2020 against the Kolkata giants SC East Bengal in the 2019-20 I-League season as a substitute in the 90th minute for Syed Suhail Pasha, which they lost 2–0. Mithran was included in the squad for four matchday and made one appearance for the club.

Club statistics

References

External links 

 
 Lenin Mithran at Football Database

1995 births
Living people
People from Kerala
Indian footballers
Chennai City FC players
Footballers from Kerala
I-League players
Association football midfielders